Aker Al Obaidi (born 21 September 1999) is an Iraqi Greco-Roman wrestler currently based in Austria. He was selected by the International Olympic Committee (IOC) to compete for the Refugee Olympic Team at the 2020 Summer Olympics in Tokyo, Japan.

Early life
Al Obaidi started wrestling at age 6 and continued until 14 when he was forced to leave his home in Mosul, Iraq.

References

External links
 

1999 births
Living people
Iraqi male sport wrestlers
Iraqi refugees
Refugee Olympic Team at the 2020 Summer Olympics
Wrestlers at the 2020 Summer Olympics
People from Mosul
20th-century Iraqi people
21st-century Iraqi people